Kapiti Marine Reserve is  a protected area on two sides of Kapiti Island, off the southern west coast of the North Island of New Zealand. It was created in 1992.

The Western section lies off the north-west coast of Kapiti Island. The Eastern section lies between the island and Paraparaumu Beach and Waikanae Beach on the mainland. It is 30 kilometres north of the city of Porirua.

See also
Marine reserves of New Zealand

References

External links
Kapiti Marine Reserve at the Department of Conservation
Kapiti Marine Reserve fact sheet
 

Marine reserves of New Zealand
Protected areas of the Wellington Region
Protected areas established in 1992
1992 establishments in New Zealand